The Outer Hebrides or Western Isles (  or   or  ("islands of the strangers")), sometimes known as the Long Isle/Long Island, is an island chain off the west coast of mainland Scotland. They form part of the archipelago of the Hebrides, separated from the Scottish mainland and from the Inner Hebrides by the waters of the Minch, the Little Minch, and the Sea of the Hebrides. Scottish Gaelic is the predominant spoken language, although in a few areas English speakers form a majority.

Most of the islands have a bedrock formed from ancient metamorphic rocks, and the climate is mild and oceanic.

There are various important prehistoric structures, many of which pre-date the first written references to the islands by Roman and Greek authors. Control of the islands was then held by clan chiefs, principal amongst whom were the MacLeods, MacDonalds, Mackenzies and MacNeils. The Highland Clearances of the 19th century had a devastating effect on many communities, and it is only in recent years that population levels have ceased to decline. Much of the land is now under local control, and commercial activity is based on tourism, crofting, fishing, and weaving. 

Sea transport is crucial, and a variety of ferry services operate between the islands and to mainland Scotland. Modern navigation systems now minimise the dangers, but in the past the stormy seas have claimed many ships. Religion, music and sport are important aspects of local culture, and there are numerous designated conservation areas to protect the natural environment.

Etymology 

The earliest written references that have survived relating to the islands were made by Pliny the Elder in his Natural History, where he states that there are 30 , and makes a separate reference to Dumna, which Watson (1926) concludes is unequivocally the Outer Hebrides. Pliny probably took his information from Pytheas of Massilia who visited Britain sometime between 322 and 285 BC. It is possible that Ptolemy did as well, as Agricola's information about the west coast of Scotland was of poor quality. Breeze also suggests that  might be Lewis and Harris, the largest island of the Outer Hebrides although he conflates this single island with the name "Long Island". Watson (1926)  states that the meaning of Ptolemy's  is unknown and that the root may be pre-Celtic. Murray (1966) claims that Ptolemy's  was originally derived from the Old Norse , meaning "isles on the edge of the sea". This idea is often repeated but no firm evidence of this derivation has emerged.

Other early written references include the flight of the Nemed people from Ireland to Domon, which is mentioned in the 12th-century  and a 13th-century poem concerning , then the heir to the throne of Mann and the Isles, who is said to have "broken the gate of ".  means "the plain of Domhna (or Domon)", but the precise meaning of the text is not clear.

In Irish mythology the islands were the home of the Fomorians, described as "huge and ugly" and "ship men of the sea". Indech, son of the goddess Domnu, who ruled over the deep seas).

Geography 

The islands form an archipelago whose major islands are Lewis and Harris, North Uist, Benbecula, South Uist, and Barra. It incorporates Lewis in the north and Harris in the south, both of which are frequently referred to as individual islands, although they are connected by land. The island does not have a single name in either English or Gaelic, and is referred to as "Lewis and Harris", "Lewis with Harris", "Harris with Lewis" etc.

The largest islands are deeply indented by arms of the sea such as Loch Ròg, Loch Seaforth and Loch nam Madadh. There are also more than 7,500 freshwater lochs in the Outer Hebrides, about 24% of the total for the whole of Scotland. North and South Uist and Lewis, in particular, have landscapes with a high percentage of fresh water and a maze and complexity of loch shapes. Harris has fewer large bodies of water but has innumerable small lochans. Of Loch Sgadabhagh on North Uist it has been said that "there is probably no other loch in Britain which approaches Loch Scadavay in irregularity and complexity of outline."

Much of the western coastline of the islands is machair, a fertile low-lying dune pastureland. Lewis is comparatively flat, and largely consists of treeless moors of blanket peat. Most of Harris is mountainous, with large areas of exposed rock and Clisham, the archipelago's only Corbett, reaches  in height. North and South Uist and Benbecula (sometimes collectively referred to as The Uists) have sandy beaches and wide cultivated areas of machair to the west and virtually uninhabited mountainous areas to the east. This includes the Uists themselves and the islands linked to them by causeways and bridges.

The scenic qualities of the islands are reflected in the fact that three of Scotland's forty national scenic areas (NSAs) are located here. The national scenic areas are defined so as to identify areas of exceptional scenery and to ensure its protection from inappropriate development, and are considered to represent the type of scenic beauty "popularly associated with Scotland and for which it is renowned". The three NSA within the Outer Hebrides are:

South Lewis, Harris and North Uist National Scenic Area covers the mountainous south west of Lewis, all of Harris, the Sound of Harris and the northern part of North Uist.
An area of the south west coast of South Uist is designated as the South Uist Machair National Scenic Area.
The archipelago of St Kilda is also listed as an NSA, alongside many other conservation designations.

Flora and fauna 

Much of the archipelago is a protected habitat, including both the islands and the surrounding waters. There are 53 Sites of Special Scientific Interest of which the largest are Loch an Duin, North Uist and North Harris. South Uist is considered the best place in the UK for the aquatic plant Slender Naiad, which is a European Protected Species.

There has been considerable controversy over hedgehogs on the Uists. Hedgehogs are not native to the islands but were introduced in the 1970s to reduce garden pests. Their spread posed a threat to the eggs of ground-nesting wading birds. In 2003 Scottish Natural Heritage undertook culls of hedgehogs in the area, but these were halted in 2007; trapped animals are now relocated to the mainland.

Nationally important populations of breeding waders are present in the Outer Hebrides, including common redshank, dunlin, lapwing and ringed plover. The islands also provide a habitat for other important species such as corncrake, hen harrier, golden eagle and otter. Offshore, basking shark and various species of whale and dolphin can often be seen, and the remoter islands' seabird populations are of international significance. St Kilda has 60,000 northern gannets, amounting to 24% of the world population; 49,000 breeding pairs of Leach's petrel, up to 90% of the European population; and 136,000 pairs of puffin and 67,000 northern fulmar pairs, about 30% and 13% of the respective UK totals. Mingulay is an important breeding ground for razorbills, with 9,514 pairs, 6.3% of the European population.

The bumblebee Bombus jonellus var. hebridensis is endemic to the Hebrides and there are local variants of the dark green fritillary and green-veined white butterflies.  The St Kilda wren is a subspecies of wren whose range is confined to the islands whose name it bears.

Population 

The islands' total population was 26,502 at the 2001 census, and the 2011 figure was 27,684. During the same period Scottish island populations as a whole grew by 4% to 103,702. The largest settlement in the Outer Hebrides is Stornoway on Lewis, which has a population of about 8,100.

The population estimate for 2019 was 26,720 according to a Comhairle nan Eilean Siar report which added that "the population of the Outer Hebrides is ageing" and that "young adults [...] leave the islands for further education or employment purposes". Of the total population, 6,953 people reside in the "Stornoway settlement Laxdale (Lacasdal), Sandwick (Sanndabhaig) and Newmarket" with the balance distributed over 280 townships. 

In addition to the major North Ford and South Ford causeways that connect North Uist to Benbecula via the northern of the Grimsays, and another causeway from Benbecula to South Uist, several other islands are linked by smaller causeways or bridges. This means that all the inhabited islands are now connected to at least one other island by a land transport route.

Uninhabited islands 

In common with the other main island chains of Scotland, many of the more remote islands were abandoned during the 19th and 20th centuries, in some cases after continuous habitation since the prehistoric period. More than 35 such islands have been identified in the Outer Hebrides alone. On Barra Head, for example, Historic Scotland have identified eighty-three archaeological sites on the island, the majority being of a pre-medieval date. In the 18th century, the population was over fifty, but the last native islanders had left by 1931. The island became completely uninhabited by 1980 with the automation of the lighthouse.

Some of the smaller islands continue to contribute to modern culture. The "Mingulay Boat Song", although evocative of island life, was written after the abandonment of the island in 1938 and Taransay hosted the BBC television series Castaway 2000. Others have played a part in Scottish history.

Smaller isles and skerries and other island groups pepper the North Atlantic surrounding the main islands. While Rona used to support a small population who grew grain and raised cattle,  is an inhospitable rock.

Geology 

Most of the islands have a bedrock formed from Lewisian gneiss. These are amongst the oldest rocks in Europe, having been formed in the Precambrian period up to three billion years ago. In addition to the Outer Hebrides, they form basement deposits on the Scottish mainland west of the Moine Thrust and on the islands of Coll and Tiree. These rocks are largely igneous in origin, mixed with metamorphosed marble, quartzite and mica schist and intruded by later basaltic dykes and granite magma. The gneiss's delicate pink colours are exposed throughout the islands and it is sometimes referred to by geologists as "The Old Boy".

Granite intrusions are found in the parish of Barvas in west Lewis, and another forms the summit plateau of the mountain Roineabhal in Harris. The granite here is anorthosite, and is similar in composition to rocks found in the mountains of the Moon. There are relatively small outcrops of Triassic sandstone at Broad Bay near Stornoway. The Shiant Islands and St Kilda are formed from much later tertiary basalt and basalt and gabbros respectively. The sandstone at Broad Bay was once thought to be Torridonian or Old Red Sandstone.

Climate 

The Outer Hebrides have a cool temperate climate that is remarkably mild and steady for such a northerly latitude, due to the influence of the North Atlantic Current. The average temperature for the year is 6 °C (44 °F) in January and 14 °C (57 °F) in summer. The summer days are relatively long and May to August is the driest period. Winds are a key feature of the climate and even in summer there are almost constant breezes. According to the writer W. H. Murray if a visitor asks an islander for a weather forecast "he will not, like a mainlander answer dry, wet or sunny, but quote you a figure from the Beaufort Scale." There are gales one day in six at the Butt of Lewis and small fish are blown onto the grass on top of 190 metre (620 ft) high cliffs at Barra Head during winter storms.

Prehistory 

History 

In Scotland, the Celtic Iron Age way of life, often troubled but never extinguished by Rome, re-asserted itself when the legions abandoned any permanent occupation in 211 AD. Hanson (2003) writes: "For many years it has been almost axiomatic in studies of the period that the Roman conquest must have had some major medium or long-term impact on Scotland. On present evidence that cannot be substantiated either in terms of environment, economy, or, indeed, society. The impact appears to have been very limited. The general picture remains one of broad continuity, not of disruption ... The Roman presence in Scotland was little more than a series of brief interludes within a longer continuum of indigenous development." The Romans' direct impact on the Highlands and Islands was scant and there is no evidence that they ever actually landed in the Outer Hebrides.

The later Iron Age inhabitants of the northern and western Hebrides were probably Pictish, although the historical record is sparse. Hunter (2000) states that in relation to King Bridei I of the Picts in the sixth century AD: "As for Shetland, Orkney, Skye and the Western Isles, their inhabitants, most of whom appear to have been Pictish in culture and speech at this time, are likely to have regarded Bridei as a fairly distant presence." The island of Pabbay is the site of the Pabbay Stone, the only extant Pictish symbol stone in the Outer Hebrides. This 6th century stele shows a flower, V-rod and lunar crescent to which has been added a later and somewhat crude cross.

Norse control 

Viking raids began on Scottish shores towards the end of the 8th century AD and the Hebrides came under Norse control and settlement during the ensuing decades, especially following the success of Harald Fairhair at the Battle of Hafrsfjord in 872. In the Western Isles Ketill Flatnose was the dominant figure of the mid 9th century, by which time he had amassed a substantial island realm and made a variety of alliances with other Norse leaders. These princelings nominally owed allegiance to the Norwegian crown, although in practice the latter's control was fairly limited. Norse control of the Hebrides was formalised in 1098 when Edgar, King of Scotland formally signed the islands over to Magnus III of Norway. The Scottish acceptance of Magnus III as King of the Isles came after the Norwegian king had conquered Orkney, the Hebrides and the Isle of Man in a swift campaign earlier the same year, directed against the local Norwegian leaders of the various islands‘ petty kingdoms. By capturing the islands Magnus imposed a more direct royal control, although at a price. His skald Bjorn Cripplehand recorded that in Lewis "fire played high in the heaven" as "flame spouted from the houses" and that in the Uists "the king dyed his sword red in blood". Thompson (1968) provides a more literal translation: "Fire played in the fig-trees of Liodhus; it mounted up to heaven. Far and wide the people were driven to flight. The fire gushed out of the houses".

The Hebrides were now part of Kingdom of the Isles, whose rulers were themselves vassals of the Kings of Norway. This situation lasted until the partitioning of the Western Isles in 1156, at which time the Outer Hebrides remained under Norwegian control while the Inner Hebrides broke out under Somerled, the Norse-Celtic kinsman of the Manx royal house.

Following the ill-fated 1263 expedition of Haakon IV of Norway, the Outer Hebrides along with the Isle of Man, were yielded to the Kingdom of Scotland a result of the 1266 Treaty of Perth. Although their contribution to the islands can still be found in personal and placenames, the archaeological record of the Norse period is very limited. The best known find from this time is the Lewis chessmen, which date from the mid 12th century.

Scots rule 

As the Norse era drew to a close the Norse-speaking princes were gradually replaced by Gaelic-speaking clan chiefs including the MacLeods of Lewis and Harris, the MacDonalds of the Uists and MacNeil of Barra. This transition did little to relieve the islands of internecine strife although by the early 14th century the MacDonald Lords of the Isles, based on Islay, were in theory these chiefs' feudal superiors and managed to exert some control.

The growing threat that Clan Donald posed to the Scottish crown led to the forcible dissolution of the Lordship of the Isles by James IV in 1493, but although the king had the power to subdue the organised military might of the Hebrides, he and his immediate successors lacked the will or ability to provide an alternative form of governance. The House of Stuart's attempts to control the Outer Hebrides were then at first desultory and little more than punitive expeditions. In 1506 the Earl of Huntly besieged and captured Stornoway Castle using cannon. In 1540 James V himself conducted a royal tour, forcing the clan chiefs to accompany him. There followed a period of peace, but all too soon the clans were at loggerheads again.

In 1598 King James VI authorised some "Gentleman Adventurers" from Fife to civilise the "most barbarous Isle of Lewis". The colonists tried again in 1605 with the same result but a third attempt in 1607 was more successful, and in due course Stornoway became a Burgh of Barony. By this time Lewis was held by the Mackenzies of Kintail, (later the Earls of Seaforth), who pursued a more enlightened approach, investing in fishing in particular. The historian W. C. MacKenzie was moved to write:

The Seaforth's royalist inclinations led to Lewis becoming garrisoned during the Wars of the Three Kingdoms by Cromwell's troops, who destroyed the old castle in Stornoway and in 1645 Lewismen fought on the royalist side at the Battle of Auldearn. A new era of Hebridean involvement in the affairs of the wider world was about to commence.

British era 

With the implementation of the Treaty of Union in 1707 the Hebrides became part of the new Kingdom of Great Britain, but the clans' loyalties to a distant monarch were not strong. A considerable number of islandmen "came out" in support of the Jacobite Earl of Mar in the "15" although the response to the 1745 rising was muted. Nonetheless the aftermath of the decisive Battle of Culloden, which effectively ended Jacobite hopes of a Stuart restoration, was widely felt. The British government's strategy was to estrange the clan chiefs from their kinsmen and turn their descendants into English-speaking landlords whose main concern was the revenues their estates brought rather than the welfare of those who lived on them. This may have brought peace to the islands, but in the following century it came at a terrible price.

The Highland Clearances of the 19th century destroyed communities throughout the Highlands and Islands as the human populations were evicted and replaced with sheep farms. For example, Colonel Gordon of Cluny, owner of Barra, South Uist and Benbecula, evicted thousands of islanders using trickery and cruelty and even offered to sell Barra to the government as a penal colony. The position was exacerbated by the failure of the islands' kelp industry, which thrived from the 18th century until the end of the Napoleonic Wars in 1815 and large scale emigration became endemic. For example, hundreds left North Uist for Cape Breton, Nova Scotia. The pre-clearance population of the island had been almost 5,000, although by 1841 it had fallen to 3,870 and was only 2,349 by 1931.

The Highland potato famine (Gaiseadh a’ bhuntàta, in Scottish Gaelic), caused by a blight, started in 1846 and had a serious impact, because many islanders were crofters; potatoes were a staple of their diet. Violent riots became common. Charities, encouraged by George Pole and others in the Commissariat (a military agency) encouraged charities to come to the rescue. The Free Church was particularly helpful, "delivering oatmeal to famine-affected families all across the West Highlands and Islands", according to one report. Another report states that the Church "was prompt in organising an efficient system of private charity across the Hebrides and on the Western seaboard. It cooperated with the Edinburgh and Glasgow Relief Committees".

An interdenominational charity was in place by early 1847 and took the most significant role in famine relief. Some landowners also provided a great deal of assistance, according to one history of the region: "MacLeod of Dunvegan bought in food for his people, some eight thousand of them" ... MacLean of Ardgour provided food, and introduced new crops into the area - peas, cabbages and carrots ... Sir James Matheson on Lewis spent £329,000 on improving his lands, hoping to provide a more secure future for his people". The government of Britain provided some assistance, thanks to Sir Charles Trevelyan, who arranged for food distribution at Portree and Tobermory. The British Association for the Relief of Distress in Ireland and the Highlands and Islands of Scotland also helped as did donations received from North America.  The blight struck again over the next two years, requiring an extra tax on landowners to help feed the population. The British government began encouraging mass emigration.

For those who remained new economic opportunities emerged through the export of cattle, commercial fishing and tourism. During the summer season in the 1860s and 1870s five thousand inhabitants of Lewis could be found in Wick on the mainland of Scotland, employed on the fishing boats and at the quaysides. Nonetheless emigration and military service became the choice of many and the archipelago's populations continued to dwindle throughout the late 19th and 20th centuries. By 2001 the population of North Uist was only 1,271.

The work of the Napier Commission and the Congested Districts Board, and the passing of the Crofting Act of 1886 helped, but social unrest continued. In July 1906 grazing land on Vatersay was raided by landless men from Barra and its isles. Lady Gordon Cathcart took legal action against the "raiders" but the visiting judge took the view that she had neglected her duties as a landowner and that "long indifference to the necessities of the cottars had gone far to drive them to exasperation". This process involved a transition from these places being perceived as relatively self-sufficient agricultural economies to a view becoming held by both island residents and outsiders alike that they lacked the essential services of a modern industrial economy.

There were gradual economic improvements, among the most visible of which was the replacement of the traditional thatched blackhouse with accommodation of a more modern design. The creation of the Highlands and Islands Development Board and the discovery of substantial deposits of North Sea oil in 1965, the establishment of a unitary local authority for the islands in 1975 and more recently the renewables sector have all contributed to a degree of economic stability in recent decades. The Arnish yard has had a chequered history but has been a significant employer in both the oil and renewables industries. , the local authority, employs 2,000 people, making it the largest employer in the Outer Hebrides. See also the " area plan 2010" and the 's "Factfile – Economy".

Economy 

Modern commercial activities centre on tourism, crofting, fishing, and weaving including the manufacture of Harris tweed. Crofting remains popular especially on Lewis and Harris (population 21,000) with over 920 active crofters according to a 2020 report: "with crofts ranging in size from as small as a single hectare to having access to thousands of hectares through the medium of community grazing". Crofters can apply for subsidy grants; some of these are intended to help them find other avenues to supplement their incomes. Some of the funding schemes available to crofters in the Hebrides include the "Basic Payment Scheme, the suckler beef support scheme, the upland sheep support scheme and the Less Favoured Area support scheme and the Crofting Agricultural Grant Scheme (CAGS), as of March 2020. 

According to the Scottish Government, "tourism is by far and away the mainstay industry" of the Outer Hebrides, "generating £65m in economic value for the islands, sustaining around 1000 jobs" The report adds that the "islands receive 219,000 visitors per year". 

Some of the larger islands have development trusts that support the local economy and, in striking contrast to the 19th and 20th century domination by absentee landlords, more than two thirds of the Western Isles population now lives on community-owned estates. However the economic position of the islands remains relatively precarious. The Western Isles, including Stornoway, are defined by Highlands and Islands Enterprise as an economically "Fragile Area" and they have an estimated trade deficit of some £163.4 million. Overall, the area is relatively reliant on primary industries and the public sector, and fishing and fish farming in particular are vulnerable to environmental impacts, changing market pressures, and European legislation.

There is some optimism about the possibility of future developments in, for example, renewable energy generation, tourism, and education, and after declines in the 20th century the population has stabilised since 2003, although it is ageing. A 2019 report, using key assumptions, (mortality, fertility and migration) was less optimistic. It predicted that the population is "projected to fall to 22,709 by 2043"; that translates to a 16% decline, or 4,021 people, between 2018 and 2043.

The UK’s largest community-owned wind farm, the 9MW Beinn Ghrideag, a "3 turbine, 9MW scheme" is located outside Stornoway and is operated by Point and Sandwick Trust (PST). 

The Isle of Lewis web site states that Stornoway's sheltered harbour has been important for centuries; it was named Steering Bay by Vikings who often visited. A December 2020 report stated that a new deep water terminal was to be developed, the Stornoway Deep Water Terminal, using a £49 million investment. The plan included berths for cruise ships as long as 360 meters, berths for large cargo vessels, and a freight ferry berth.

Politics and local government 

From the passing of the Local Government (Scotland) Act 1889 to 1975 Lewis formed part of the county of Ross and Cromarty and the rest of the archipelago, including Harris, was part of Inverness-shire.

The Outer Hebrides became a unitary council area in 1975, although in most of the rest of Scotland similar unitary councils were not established until 1996. Since then, the islands have formed one of the 32 unitary council areas that now cover the whole country, with the council officially known by its Gaelic name,  under the terms of the Local Government (Gaelic Names) (Scotland) Act 1997. The  is one of only three Councils in Scotland with a majority of elected members who are independents. The other independent-run councils are Shetland and Orkney. Moray is run by a Conservative/Independent coalition.

During the 2014 Scottish independence referendum the area voted against independence by a margin of 53.42% (10,544) to 46.58% (9,195) in favour on a turnout of 86.2%

In 2022, as part of the Levelling Up White Paper, an "Island Forum" was proposed, which would allow local policymakers and residents in the Outer Hebrides to work alongside their counterparts in Shetland, Orkney, Anglesey and the Isle of Wight on common issues, such as broadband connectivity, and provide a platform for them to communicate directly with the government on the challenges island communities face in terms of levelling up.

Scottish Gaelic language 

The Outer Hebrides have historically been a very strong Scottish Gaelic (Gàidhlig) speaking area. Both the 1901 and 1921 census reported that all parishes were over 75% Gaelic speaking, including areas of high population density such as Stornoway. However, the Education (Scotland) Act 1872 mandated English-only education, and is now recognised as having dealt a major blow to the language. People still living can recall being beaten for speaking Gaelic in school. Nonetheless, by 1971 most areas were still more than 75% Gaelic speaking – with the exception of Stornoway, Benbecula and South Uist at 50–74%.

In the 2001 census, each island overall was over 50% Gaelic speaking – South Uist (71%), Harris (69%), Barra (68%), North Uist (67%), Lewis (56%) and Benbecula (56%). With 59.3% of Gaelic speakers or a total of 15,723 speakers, this made the Outer Hebrides the most strongly coherent Gaelic speaking area in Scotland.

Most areas were between 60-74% Gaelic speaking and the areas with the highest density of over 80% are Scalpay near Harris, Newtonferry and Kildonan, whilst Daliburgh, Linshader, Eriskay, Brue, Boisdale, West Harris, Ardveenish, Soval, Ness, and Bragar all have more than 75%. The areas with the lowest density of speakers are Stornoway (44%), Braigh (41%), Melbost (41%), and Balivanich (37%).

The Gaelic Language (Scotland) Act was enacted by the Scottish Parliament in 2005 to provide continuing support for the language. However, by 2011 the overall percentage of Gaelic speakers in the Outer Hebrides had fallen to 52%.

(islands of the foreigners or strangers) is also heard occasionally, a name that was originally used by mainland Highlanders when the islands were ruled by the Norse.

The individual island and place names in the Outer Hebrides have mixed Gaelic and Norse origins. Various Gaelic terms are used repeatedly:

There are also several islands called  from the Norse  meaning "tidal" or "ebb island".

Transport 

Scheduled ferry services between the Outer Hebrides and the Scottish Mainland and Inner Hebrides operate on the following routes:

 Oban to Castlebay on Barra
Oban to Lochboisdale on South Uist (Winter Only)
Mallaig to Lochboisdale on South Uist
 Uig on Skye to Tarbert on Harris
 Uig on Skye to Lochmaddy on North Uist
 Ullapool to Stornoway on Lewis
 Tiree to Castlebay, Barra (summer only).

Other ferries operate between some of the islands.

National Rail services are available for onward journeys, from stations at Oban and Mallaig, which has direct services to Glasgow. However, parliamentary approval notwithstanding, plans in the 1890s to lay a railway connection to Ullapool were unable to obtain sufficient funding.

There are scheduled flights from Stornoway, Benbecula and Barra airports both inter-island and to the mainland. Barra's airport is claimed to be the only one in the world to have scheduled flights landing on a beach. At high water the runways are under the sea so flight times vary with the tide.

Bus na Comhairle
Bus na Comhairle (meaning "Bus of the Council") is the council-owned local bus company of the Western Isles of Scotland. The company serves the Broadbay area of Lewis with 7 buses - 6 Optare Solos and 1 ADL Enviro 200.

Shipwrecks 

The archipelago is exposed to wind and tide, and lighthouses are sited as an aid to navigation at locations from Barra Head in the south to the Butt of Lewis in the north. There are numerous sites of wrecked ships, and the Flannan Isles are the location of an enduring mystery that occurred in December 1900, when all three lighthouse keepers vanished without trace.

Annie Jane, a three-masted immigrant ship out of Liverpool bound for Montreal, Canada, struck rocks off the West Beach of Vatersay during a storm on Tuesday 28 September 1853. Within ten minutes the ship began to founder and break up casting 450 people into the raging sea. In spite of the conditions, islanders tried to rescue the passengers and crew. The remains of 350 men, women and children were buried in the dunes behind the beach and a small cairn and monument marks the site.

The tiny Beasts of Holm off the east coast of Lewis were the site of the sinking of  during the first few hours of 1919, one of the worst maritime disasters in United Kingdom waters during the 20th century. Calvay in the Sound of Barra provided the inspiration for Compton Mackenzie's novel Whisky Galore after the  ran aground there with a cargo of single malt in 1941.

Culture 

Christianity has deep roots in the Western Isles, but owing mainly to the different allegiances of the clans in the past, the people in the northern islands (Lewis, Harris, North Uist) have historically been predominantly Presbyterian, and those of the southern islands (Benbecula, South Uist, Barra) predominantly Roman Catholic.

At the time of the 2001 Census, 42% of the population identified themselves as being affiliated with the Church of Scotland, with 13% Roman Catholic and 28% with other Christian churches. Many of this last group belong to the Free Church of Scotland, known for its strict observance of the Sabbath. 11% stated that they had no religion. This made the Western Isles the Scottish council area with the smallest percentage of non-religious in the population. There are also small Episcopalian congregations in Lewis and Harris and the Outer Hebrides are part of the Diocese of Argyll and The Isles in both the Episcopalian and Catholic traditions.

Gaelic music is popular in the islands and the Lewis and Harris Traditional Music Society plays an active role in promoting the genre. Fèis Bharraigh began in 1981 with the aim of developing the practice and study of the Gaelic language, literature, music, drama and culture on the islands of Barra and Vatersay. A two-week festival, it has inspired 43 other feisean throughout Scotland. The Lewis Pipe Band was founded in 1904 and the Lewis and Harris Piping Society in 1977.

Outdoor activities including rugby, football, golf, shinty, fishing, riding, canoeing, athletics, and multi-sports are popular in the Western Isles. The Hebridean Challenge is an adventure race run in five daily stages, which takes place along the length of the islands and includes hill and road running, road and mountain biking, short sea swims and demanding sea kayaking sections. There are four main sports centres: Ionad Spors Leodhais in Stornoway, which has a 25 m swimming pool; Harris Sports Centre; Lionacleit Sports Centre on Benbecula; and Castlebay Sports Centre on Barra. The Western Isles is a member of the International Island Games Association.

South Uist is home to the Askernish Golf Course. The oldest links in the Outer Hebrides, it was designed by Old Tom Morris. Although it was in use until the 1930s, its existence was largely forgotten until 2005 and it is now being restored to Morris's original design.

See also 
 Constitutional status of Orkney, Shetland and the Western Isles
 Hebridean Myths and Legends
 Leod
 List of Category A listed buildings in the Western Isles
 List of places in the Western Isles
 List of rulers of the Kingdom of the Isles
 List of islands of Scotland
 Ljótólfr
 Solar eclipse of 1 May 1185
 2012 Comhairle nan Eilean Siar election
 Virtual Hebrides

Notes

References

Sources 

 Armit, Ian (1998) Scotland's Hidden History. Tempus (in association with Historic Scotland). 
 Ballin Smith, B. and Banks, I. (eds) (2002) In the Shadow of the Brochs, the Iron Age in Scotland. Stroud. Tempus. 
 Ballin Smith, Beverley; Taylor, Simon; Williams, Gareth (eds) (2007) West Over Sea: Studies in Scandinavian Sea-Borne Expansion and Settlement Before 1300. Leiden. Koninklijke Brill. 
 Benvie, Neil (2004) Scotland's Wildlife. London. Aurum Press. 
 Buxton, Ben (1995) Mingulay: An Island and Its People. Edinburgh. Birlinn. 
 Downham, Clare (2007) Viking Kings of Britain and Ireland: The Dynasty of Ívarr to A.D. 1014. Edinburgh. Dunedin Academic Press. 
 Gillen, Con (2003) Geology and landscapes of Scotland. Harpenden. Terra Publishing. 
 Gregory, Donald (1881) The History of the Western Highlands and Isles of Scotland 1493–1625. Edinburgh. Birlinn. 2008 reprint – originally published by Thomas D. Morrison. 
 Hanson, William S. "The Roman Presence: Brief Interludes", in Edwards, Kevin J. & Ralston, Ian B.M. (Eds) (2003) Scotland After the Ice Age: Environment, Archaeology and History, 8000 BC – AD 1000. Edinburgh. Edinburgh University Press.
 Haswell-Smith, Hamish. (2004) The Scottish Islands. Edinburgh. Canongate. 
 Hunter, James (2000) Last of the Free: A History of the Highlands and Islands of Scotland. Edinburgh. Mainstream. 
 Keay, J. & Keay, J. (1994) Collins Encyclopaedia of Scotland. London. HarperCollins. 
       
 McKirdy, Alan Gordon, John & Crofts, Roger (2007) Land of Mountain and Flood: The Geology and Landforms of Scotland. Edinburgh. Birlinn. 
 Maclean, Charles (1977) Island on the Edge of the World: the Story of St. Kilda. Edinburgh. Canongate. 
 Malhotra, R. (1992) Anthropology of Development: Commemoration Volume in Honour of Professor I.P. Singh. New Delhi. Mittal. 
 Li, Martin (2005) Adventure Guide to Scotland. Hunter Publishing. Retrieved 19 May 2010.
 Miers, Mary (2008) The Western Seaboard: An Illustrated Architectural Guide. The Rutland Press. 
 
 Murray, W.H. (1966) The Hebrides. London. Heinemann.
 Murray, W.H. (1973) The Islands of Western Scotland: the Inner and Outer Hebrides. London. Eyre Methuen. 
 Ross, David (2005) Scotland – History of a Nation. Lomond. 
 Rotary Club of Stornoway (1995) The Outer Hebrides Handbook and Guide. Machynlleth. Kittiwake. 
 Thompson, Francis (1968) Harris and Lewis, Outer Hebrides. Newton Abbot. David & Charles. 
 Watson, W. J. (1994) The Celtic Place-Names of Scotland. Edinburgh; Birlinn. . First published 1926.

External links 

 
 Stornoway Port Authority
 Comhairle nan Eilean Siar
 2001 Census Results for the Outer Hebrides
 MacTV
 Reefnet
 Hebrides.com Photographic website from ex-Eolas Sam Maynard
 www.visithebrides.com Western Isles Tourist Board site from Reefnet
 Virtual Hebrides.com Content from the VH, which went its own way and became Virtual Scotland.
 hebrides.ca Home of the Quebec-Hebridean Scots who were cleared from Lewis to Quebec 1838–1920s

 
.
Archipelagoes of Scotland
Archipelagoes of the Atlantic Ocean
Council areas of Scotland
Lieutenancy areas of Scotland
Regions of Scotland
Former Norwegian colonies
Gaelic culture